Dachuan District is a district of Dazhou in northeastern Sichuan province. It was called Da County or Daxian, until July 2013, when it renamed to Dachuan District.

Administrative divisions 
Dachuan District administers 5 subdistricts, 22 towns and 5 townships.

Subdistricts

 Sanliping (三里坪街道)
 Cuiping (翠屏街道)
 Shiban (石板街道)
 Binlang (斌郎街道)
 Mingyuejiang (明月江街道)
 Yanliu (杨柳街道)

Towns

Townships

 Anren (安仁乡)
 Yaotang (幺塘乡)
 Longhui (龙会乡)
 Hurang (虎让乡)
 Micheng (米城乡)

Transport
Dazhou Jinya Airport

References

External links
 Dachuan District Official government website

Districts of Sichuan
Dazhou